The 2021–22 Arkansas State Red Wolves women's basketball team represented Arkansas State University during the 2021–22 NCAA Division I women's basketball season. The basketball team, led by first full-year head coach Destinee Rogers, played all home games at the First National Bank Arena along with the Arkansas State Red Wolves men's basketball team. They were members of the Sun Belt Conference.

Roster

Schedule and results

|-
!colspan=9 style=| Non-conference Regular Season
|-

|-
!colspan=9 style=| Conference Regular Season
|-

|-
!colspan=9 style=| Sun Belt Tournament

See also
 2021–22 Arkansas State Red Wolves men's basketball team

References

Arkansas State Red Wolves women's basketball seasons
Arkansas State Red Wolves
Arkansas State Red Wolves women's basketball
Arkansas State Red Wolves women's basketball